Sildajazzprisen awarded by the company Statoil to a Norwegian jazz musician or group. The award consists of a sum of money and a picture signed the year Sildajazz artist.

Statoil sildajazz Prize was first awarded in 2000.

Award Winners 
2000: The Brazz Brothers, from Langevåg
2001: Egil Kapstad, from Kristiansand
2002: Svein Olav Herstad, from Haugesund
2003: Dag Arnesen, from Bergen
2004: Alf Wilhelm Lundberg, from Haugesund
2005: Bodil Niska, from Oslo
2006: Staffan William-Olsson, from Oslo
2007: Christina Bjordal, from Haugesund
2008: Olav Dale, from Voss
2009: Sigurd Ulveseth, from Bergen
2010: Fredrik Luhr Dietrichson, from Haugesund
2011: Marius Neset, from Os
2012: Marte Maaland Eberson, from Bergen
2013: Julius Lind, from Haugesund
2014: Johannes Ulveraker, from Haugesund
2015: Peder "LIDO" Losnegård, from Tysvær 
2016: Mia Marlen Berg, from Tysvær

References

External links 
Sildajazzprisen website

Culture in Rogaland
Norwegian music awards
Norwegian jazz
Awards established in 2000